Ondřej Šmach (born July 21, 1986) is a Czech professional ice hockey defenceman. He is currently playing for HC Nové Zámky of the Tipsport Liga.

Šmach has also played in the Czech Extraliga for HC Znojemští Orli, Vsetínská hokejová, HC Kladno and HC Karlovy Vary.

References

External links

1986 births
Living people
HC '05 Banská Bystrica players
HC Berounští Medvědi players
Czech ice hockey defencemen
Rapaces de Gap players
Gothiques d'Amiens players
HC Karlovy Vary players
Rytíři Kladno players
HC Kometa Brno players
HC Košice players
BK Mladá Boleslav players
HC Nové Zámky players
HC Olomouc players
Orli Znojmo players
HK 36 Skalica players
HC Slovan Ústečtí Lvi players
VHK Vsetín players
People from Hodonín
Sportspeople from the South Moravian Region
Czech expatriate sportspeople in France
Czech expatriate sportspeople in Australia
Expatriate ice hockey players in Australia
Expatriate ice hockey players in France
Czech expatriate ice hockey players in Slovakia